Raya is a private, membership-based, social network application for iOS, launched in 2015. The application was initially a dating app, but over time has added features to promote professional networking and social discovery.

History 
Raya was conceived by Daniel Gendelman in 2014 and went live in February 2015. The app is available on Apple devices. In 2016, Raya acquired Chime, a video messaging startup.

Format 
Users link their profile to their Instagram account, and must create a photo montage set to music for their profile.

Secrecy 
Raya is not advertised and grows by word of mouth. If a user screenshots a profile, the app warns them that they may be removed from the platform. In May 2021, a user of Raya who met actor Matthew Perry through a match on the app created a controversy by sharing her conversation with the actor on TikTok. The TikTok video went viral but has since been deleted. The user who had shared the video has been removed from Raya for violation of the privacy policy of the app.

References

Online dating services of the United States
Mobile social software
2015 software
Computer-related introductions in 2015